Montura is an unincorporated community and census-designated place in Hendry County, Florida, United States.

Geography

Demographics

References

Unincorporated communities in Hendry County, Florida
Unincorporated communities in Florida
Census-designated places in Hendry County, Florida
Census-designated places in Florida